Cumieira is a civil parish in the municipality of Santa Marta de Penaguião, Portugal. The population in 2011 was 1,146, in an area of 11.07 km2.

References

Freguesias of Santa Marta de Penaguião